Mansoor Amjad, born 14 December 1987, is a Pakistani cricketer who plays for the Pakistan national cricket team and Leicestershire County Cricket Club in England. His father, mother, and other family members supported him throughout his career, encouraging him to play cricket. Amjad first played tape-ball cricket in the street as a child, and was known in his hometown as a bat and ball boy. He played cricket at an early age for the Saga sports cricket club, and began playing seriously in 1998–99 when he attended a Habib Bank mobile camp in Lahore. Amjad began as a leg spin bowler, and later developed his batting skills as a right-hand batsman. In 2000, Amjad was selected for the under-15 camp.

Early career 
In 2001, Amjad was selected for the Pakistan Junior cricket academy in Lahore. The following year, he was selected for the first international Pakistan U-15; Pakistan won their first-ever junior U-15 Asia Cup in Abu Dhabi. Amjad was the Man of the Match in his first U-15 match against Oman, taking five wickets for 17 runs. He was selected for the 2003 Pakistan Academy tour of South Africa, taking 11 wickets in four matches. Pakistan won the Videocon Asian Emerging Trophy that year, and Amjad was a member of the squad who defeated Sri Lanka in the final.

He was a member of Pakistan's 2004 Under-19 Cricket World Cup squad, playing eight matches and taking 16 wickets. Amjad was Man of the Match against Ireland, taking four wickets for 27 runs. He set under-19 records for best average and economy rate which stood for almost 13 years.

International career 
In 2005, the Australia A cricket team visited Pakistan; Amjad played two matches and took five wickets. He played a Pakistan Cricket Board side match for the Green team after Australia's tour, taking two wickets and scoring 29 runs. Amjad played a side match for Pakistan A against England that year.

Pakistan A won the EurAsia Cricket Series in Abu Dhabi against India the following year, and Amjad took four wickets; one was from Rohit Sharma. Amjad was named the bowler of the tournament, with 12 wickets in five matches. He was part of the Leicestershire Foxes, who won England's T20 Blast that year.

Amjad played county cricket for Leicestershire in the summer of 2007, and was asked to join the Pakistan A team in August of that year to play Australia's A team in Pakistan. He was then chosen to play against South Africa, and was Pakistan's high scorer with 42 runs.

Amjad's Twenty20 International debut was in April 2008 against Bangladesh in Karachi. Asked to bowl the sixteenth over, he took wickets on the second, fifth, and sixth balls for a hat-trick and dismissed Mahmudullah, Mashrafe Murtaza for an overall number of 1-0-3-3. In June 2008, Amjad made his One Day International debut in the Asia Cup; he took one wicket, conceding 44 runs in his allotted eight overs against Sri Lanka.

Foreign teams and leagues 
Amjad signed his first overseas contract in 2006 with the Fleetwood Hesketh Cricket Club in Southport, playing three matches and taking nine wickets. He signed with Leicestershire after he was recalled to Pakistan, playing for the Foxes through 2007.

References

External links

Leicestershire cricketers
Pakistani cricketers
Pakistan One Day International cricketers
Pakistan Twenty20 International cricketers
Sialkot cricketers
Zarai Taraqiati Bank Limited cricketers
National Bank of Pakistan cricketers
Sialkot Stallions cricketers
Punjab (Pakistan) cricketers
1987 births
Living people
Cricketers from Sialkot
Northern Knights cricketers
Galle Cricket Club cricketers
Murray College alumni